Lorenzo Vergani (born 4 September 1993) is an Italian male 400 metres hurdler.

Biography
Having obtained the IAAF qualification standard, on 27 July 2017 he was selected by Italy national athletics team's technical commissioner, Elio Locatelli, to participate in the 2017 World Championships in Athletics.

See also
 Italian all-time lists - 400 metres hurdles

References

External links
 

1993 births
Living people
Italian male hurdlers
World Athletics Championships athletes for Italy